John C. Dayton (October 28, 1837 – August 19, 1895) was a Michigan politician.

Early life
Dayton lived with his family on a farm in Grand Blanc Township after he was born on October 28, 1837.  At age 22, he worked a sharecropper farm. Jenny E. Wolverton of Saratoga County, N. Y. married Dayton on October 20, 1859, in Grand Blanc. Moving to St. Johns in 1865, he joined J. M. Frisbie in the manufacture of crackers.   He purchased his partner's share three years later.  After selling his business in 1872, he moved to Flint.  He was a dealer in horses until October 1880.  At that time, he purchased the Brotherton House, a hotel ,and renamed it Dayton House.

Political life
While in St. Johns, he served two terms as Village Trustee.  He was elected as the Mayor of the City of Flint in 1887 for a single 1-year term.

Post-political life

References

Mayors of Flint, Michigan
1837 births
1895 deaths
19th-century American politicians
People from Grand Blanc, Michigan
People from St. Johns, Michigan